Alex Cameron (born 1947) is a visual artist living and working in Toronto, Ontario. He is a member of what has been described as the third generation of artists inspired in their painting style by Jack Bush. During the first part of his career, Cameron fashioned elegantly drawn shapes into abstractions; in the latter part of his career, influenced by Tom Thomson and the Group of Seven, he sought to delineate landscape in his semi-abstract work.

Biography 
Cameron was raised in the scenic Georgian Bay area of Perry Sound, ON. His mother was a painter and his uncle was a designer in New York City. While visiting his uncle in New York City, Cameron was introduced to American abstract expressionist painting. Cameron studied at the New School of Art under Graham Coughtry, Gordon Rayner, Dennis Burton and Robert Markle. While in school, Cameron focused on formal planning and carefully drawn sketches before applying paint to a canvas. In his early career, Cameron worked as a studio assistant to Jack Bush from 1972 to 1976. Bush is said to have influenced Cameron's "lyrical semi-abstract painting style", as well as his thick impasto application of paint. Through Bush, Cameron met and maintained an ongoing, close relationship with the art critic Clement Greenberg.

Inspired by artists such as Frank Stella, Bush, Painters Eleven and the Group of Seven, Cameron's paintings primarily feature brightly colored, abstractions, which can be seen in his later work as landscapes. According to Cameron, he began his career as an artist in 1969. The artist's early works in the 1970s were "flat, unmodulated fields of color transversed by sketchy cartoon-like drawing". In the early 1980s Cameron's style developed into the "long horizontal and vertical lines of color punctuated by curves, squiggles and free hand geometry" that can be seen in his landscapes today. "The suggestion of trees or horizon is often roughly preserved but the real business of the paintings is the rhythm of line, mass, depth and color". What separates Cameron from other abstract artists is his concern with "creating the illusion of depth and dimension on a two-dimensional surface". He achieves this by creating a composition composed of a foreground, middle distance and distance. The distance usually contains a sunlit cloud-filled sky, the middle distance shows the watery surface of lakes or streams with a mountainous shore beyond. The foreground typically displays rocks, earth and vegetation. Speaking of his own compositions, Alex Cameron describes his skies as "color fields", explaining that he "has a sky just so [he] can stick stuff in it". Today, Cameron spends his time painting going back and forth between landscapes and abstracts. This explains why abstract elements can often be found in the artist's landscapes.

With increased impasto, Cameron paints by "squeezing paint out of tubes in finger-width squiggles, dashes and dots". The artist churns out, on average, one painting a week, but is able to create pieces from start to finish very quickly. He has been known to finish a 6 x 6 ft. work in one day. All of Cameron's titles are invented after the work is completed.

His process is a combination of painting en plein air and using his mind's eye to create his brightly coloured landscapes. Cameron travels to the remote areas of the Northwest Territories, the Yukon, British Columbia, Algonquin Park, Newfoundland, India and Nepal for inspiration. If he is able, he will paint on the spot, or make tiny watercolour sketches to later work up in his Toronto studio. Alternatively, he holds onto the images from his travels in his mind and transfers them to canvas, choosing the colours to portray the scenes in a different light. Cameron never paints from photographs, as he says they "give you too much information".

Cameron has had over 40 solo exhibitions since his first show at A Space Gallery in Toronto in 1971. Cameron's work is in the permanent collections of the Art Gallery of Ontario, the Agnes Etherington Art Centre in Kingston, ON, the Art Gallery of Hamilton, the Robert McLaughlin Gallery, Oshawa, and the Office of the Prime Minister of Canada, as well as numerous corporate and private collections. The 1970s were a momentous time in Alex Cameron's career. Cameron met Queen Elizabeth II of the United Kingdom during the 25th Jubilee celebrations and one of his paintings was presented to the Queen as a gift.

Alex Cameron's work is represented by Bau-Xi Gallery in Toronto and Vancouver. As well as Han Modern and Contemporary in Montreal

Selected solo exhibitions 
Alex Cameron's first public show was at A Space in 1971.
 1971 – A Space, Toronto, ON
 1980 – Art Gallery of Ontario, Toronto, ON
 1985 – Robert McLaughlin Gallery, Oshawa, ON

Collections 

Art Gallery of Ontario
Agnes Etherington Art Centre
Art Gallery of Hamilton
 The Canadian Art Database
 The Queen's Silver Jubilee Art Collection 
 Bank of America Canada
 Bell Canada Enterprises
 Canada Beaverbrook Art Gallery
 Canadian Department of Foreign Affairs and International Trade
 Canada General Electric 
 Citibank Canada Claridge Investments
 Quebec Goodman & Carr
 Imperial Oil 
 Kitchener-Waterloo Art Gallery
 The Lambton Gallery 
 Lang Michener Lawerance & Shaw
 Laurentian University
 McMaster Museum of Art
 Memorial University Art Gallery 
 Nickle Arts Museum
 Northern Telecom
 Office of the Prime Minister of Canada
 The Oshawa Group
 Osler Hoskin & Harcourt
 Prudential Reinsurance Co. 
 The Robert McLaughlin Gallery 
 Royal Bank of Canada
 Sun Life Assurance Co. of Canada
 Superior Propane
 Toronto Dominion Bank
 United Westburne Industries 
 University of Lethbridge
 Xerox Canada

References 

1947 births
Living people
Artists from Toronto
Modern artists
Landscape artists
Canadian contemporary painters
Canadian abstract artists